Malta competed at the 1936 Summer Olympics in Berlin, Germany.  The nation returned to the Olympic Games after missing the 1932 Summer Olympics.

References
Official Olympic Reports

Nations at the 1936 Summer Olympics
1936 Summer Olympics
1936 in Malta